Rest, released April 1, 2008, is the second full-length album by Virginian post-rock band Gregor Samsa. The band posted the tracks online at Imeem before the album was released. The album was released in five formats, digital (April 1), unlimited (May 13), limited (April 24), collector's, and vinyl.

Track listing
 The Adolescent – 5:32
 Ain Leuh – 5:28
 Abutting, Dismantling – 6:14
 Company – 2:19
 Jeroen Van Aken – 8:23
 Rendered Yards – 2:33
 Pseudonyms – 6:13
 First Mile, Last Mile – 7:31
 Du Meine Leise – 3:50

Contributors
 Nikki King - Voice, Piano, Rhodes, Vibraphone
 Billy Bennett - Drums, Percussion, Guitar, Bass, Vibraphone, Piano, Synth
 Champ Bennett - Piano, Voice, Guitar, Drums, Bass, Vibraphone, Mellotron, Celesta, Synth, Rhodes, String Arrangements
 Jeremiah Klinger - Baritone Guitar, Guitar, Clarinet, Piano
 Cory Bise - Bass, Baritone
 Mia Matsumiya - Violin
 Toby Driver - Clarinet, Guitar, Bass, String Arrangements
 Andrew Miller - Cello
 Alex Aldi - Synth
 Alan Weatherhead - Guitar
 Rick Alverson - Voice, Titles
 Debra Wassum - Voice
 Engineered by Alex Aldi (Gigantic) and Champ Bennett (Viking Studios & Pencil Factory)
 Mixed by Alan Weatherhead (Sound of Music)
 Mastered by Mark B. Christensen (Engine Room Audio)

References

External links
 Gregor Samsa Official Website
 Myspace page
 Imeem album page

Gregor Samsa (band) albums
2008 albums